Grass is greener, grass is always greener, or the grass is always greener on the other side may refer to:

 The Grass is Greener (play), 1956 comedy written by Hugh Williams and Margaret Williams
 The Grass Is Greener, 1960 comedy film directed by Stanley Donen and starring Cary Grant
 The Grass Is Greener (album), album by Colosseum, released in April 1970
 The Grass Is Always Greener, 2006 album by Barbara Morgenstern
 The Other Man's Grass Is Always Greener (album), 1968 album by Petula Clark
 "The Other Man's Grass Is Always Greener", 1967 single by Petula Clark
 "The Grass is Always Greener", episode 24 of The Brady Bunch
 "Beddy Bye/The Grass is Greener", episode 33 of The Fairly OddParents